The women's tournament of basketball at the 2011 Summer Universiade in China began on August 14 and ended on August 21.

Teams

Preliminary round

Group A

Group B

Group C

Group D

Quarterfinal round

Classification 9th–15th place

Quarterfinals

Semifinal round

Classification 13th–15th place

Classification 9th–12th place

Classification 5th–8th place

Semifinals

Final round

13th-place match

11th-place match

9th-place match

7th-place match

5th-place match

Bronze-medal match

Gold-medal match

Final standings

References 
Reports
Schedule

Basketball at the 2011 Summer Universiade
International women's basketball competitions hosted by China
2011
Universiade